Fakaʻosi Pifeleti (born 19 October 1996) is a United States rugby union player, currently playing for the San Diego Legion of Major League Rugby (MLR) and the United States national team. His preferred position is prop.

Professional career
Pifeleti signed for Major League Rugby side San Diego Legion for the 2021 Major League Rugby season, having previously represented the side since 2018. He is the brother of fellow United States rugby union international Kapeli Pifeleti. 

Pifeleti debuted for United States against New Zealand during the 2021 end-of-year rugby union internationals.

References

External links
itsrugby.co.uk Profile

1996 births
Living people
United States international rugby union players
San Diego Legion players
Rugby union props
People from California
American rugby union players
Austin Gilgronis players